Selar may refer to:

 Selar (fish), a genus of fishes in the family Carangidae
 Dr. Selar, a character in the television series Star Trek: The Next Generation